Lepin is a Russian surname and a Russified form of the Latvian language surname Liepiņš. Individuals with the surname include:

Stanislas Lepine (1935–1992), Russian-French Impressionist 
Anatoly Lepin (1907–1984), Soviet composer
Eduard Lepin (1889–1938), Soviet division commander and Komkor
Kanstantsin Lepin (1988), Belarusian former professional footballer
Lidiya Lepin (Lidija Liepiņa; 1891–1985), Latvian chemist

See also
Liepiņš
Łępin
Lepine (disambiguation)

Russian-language surnames
Surnames of Latvian origin